La Voz de Almería is a Spanish language local daily newspaper published in Almería, Spain. It is one of the leading papers of the region.

History and profile
La Voz de Almería was established in 1939 as Yugo, but its title was changed in 1962 after the beginning of the Francoist regime. The paper is headquartered in Almería. The publisher of the daily is Comercialización de Medios CM2000, S.A.

In the late 1990s La Voz de Almería was read by both socialists and those with a right-wing political stance.

Editors and contributors
La Voz de Almería has been edited by José María Bugella, José Cirre Jiménez, Eduardo Molina Fajardo and Donato León Tierno. Its major contributors include Manuel del Águila, Eduardo del Pino Vicente or José Ángel Tapia Garrido.

See also
List of newspapers in Spain

References

Bibliography

External links
 

1939 establishments in Spain
Mass media in Almería
Daily newspapers published in Spain
Newspapers established in 1939
Spanish-language newspapers